Under Age is a 1964 black-and-white film written and directed by Larry Buchanan and starring Annabelle Weenick, Judy Adler and Roland Royter. The film was shot in Dallas, Texas.

Plot
A woman from Dallas goes on trial, charged with encouraging her 14-year-old daughter to have sex with a 16-year-old Mexican boy.

Production 
Under Age was produced by American International Pictures (AIP). Following the success of Buchanan's previous courtroom drama Free, White and 21, AIP co-founder Samuel Z. Arkoff encouraged the filmmakers to create a similar film specifically targeted at young people. The plot was based on a real-life court case in which a woman, Wanda Duckworth, was found guilty of rape and jailed for encouraging her 15-year-old daughter to have sex with a 17-year-old male. A number of actors from Free, White and 21 returned for this film, playing the same characters.

Reception 
Under Age was given a minor release by AIP. When the film did poorly in theaters, Buchanan said he would never again do a "courtroom picture," though due to current events he soon made The Trial of Lee Harvey Oswald.

Cast

 Annabelle Weenick as Ruby Jenkins (as Anne McAdams)
 Judy Adler as Linda Jenkins
 Roland Royter as George Gomez
 George R. Russell as D.A. Tyler
 John Hicks as Prosecutor Adkins
 George Edgley as The Judge
 Tommie Russell as Mrs. Sybel Riley
 Regina Cassidy as Dr. Vivian Scott
 Patrick Cranshaw as W.J. Earnhardt (as Joseph Patrick Cranshaw)
 Raymond Bradford as Wilbur Neal
 Jonathan Ledford as Barney Jenkins
 Howard Ware as Bailiff
 Joreta C. Cherry as Court Reporter
 Robert B. Alcott as Assistant District Attorney (as Robert Alcott)
 Bill Peck as News Photographer (as William Peck)

References

External links

Films originally rejected by the British Board of Film Classification
1964 films
American black-and-white films
American International Pictures films
1964 drama films
American drama films
Films directed by Larry Buchanan
1960s English-language films
1960s American films